Jonathan Paul Luna (October 21, 1965 – December 4, 2003) was an Assistant United States Attorney in Baltimore, Maryland, who was found dead under mysterious circumstances. Luna had been stabbed 36 times with his own pocketknife before he drowned in a creek next to his car in rural Lancaster County, Pennsylvania. Investigations have proven inconclusive, and there is debate on whether Luna's death was murder or suicide.

Personal life 
Luna was born on October 21, 1965, and grew up in the Patterson housing project near Yankee Stadium in the South Bronx, New York City. His father was Filipino, and his mother an African-American from the American South. Luna received his undergraduate degree from Fordham University. He later studied at the University of North Carolina School of Law, where he was roommates with Reggie Shuford. He worked at Arnold & Porter in Washington, D.C. from 1993 to 1994 and the Federal Trade Commission from 1994 to 1997. Luna served as a prosecutor in the Brooklyn borough of New York City before moving to Baltimore to become an Assistant United States Attorney. Luna married Angela Hopkins, an obstetrician, on August 29, 1993, and they had two children.

Death 

At 11:38 p.m. on the night he died, Luna left the Baltimore courthouse and went northeast on I-95. He used his E-ZPass on I-95 into Delaware but not on the New Jersey and Pennsylvania Turnpikes. After three toll interchanges, he switched to buying toll tickets.

At 12:57 a.m., $200 was withdrawn from Luna's bank account from the ATM at the JFK Plaza service center near Newark, Delaware. At 2:47 a.m. he crossed the Delaware River toll bridge to the Pennsylvania Turnpike, and at 3:20 a.m. his debit card was used to buy gas at the Sunoco King of Prussia service plaza.

At 4:04 a.m. his car exited the turnpike at the Reading-Lancaster interchange. The toll ticket had a spot of his blood on it suggesting that he was already injured. His car was parked at the back of the Sensenig & Weaver Well Drilling company at 1439 Dry Tavern Road, Denver, Pennsylvania (Brecknock Township) before it was later driven into the creek.

At 5:00 a.m., the first employee of Sensenig & Weaver arrived, and half an hour later at 5:30 a.m. the car was noticed, with its lights off and the front end into the stream. Blood was smeared over the driver's door and the front left of the car. Luna was face down in the stream under the car engine. He was wearing a suit and a black overcoat with his court ID around his neck. A pool of blood was found on the rear seat floor. Although stabbed 36 times with his own pocketknife around the chest and neck plus a head injury, the death was due to drowning.

No suspects or motive for murder were determined. The federal authorities (FBI) lean toward calling it a suicide and came to the conclusion he was alone from the time he left his office until his body was found, but the local Lancaster County authorities, including two successive coroners, ruled it a homicide. Additional evidence collected during the investigation captured a second blood type and a partial print, as well as some grainy footage from near the time of the gas station purchase made with Luna's credit card at the Sunoco service plaza. The investigation remains ongoing, and there is an unclaimed federal reward of $100,000 for information leading to a conviction.

Theories

Suicide 
It was initially reported that Luna did not have the expected substantial defense wounds on his hands and that many of the wounds are shallow which are called "hesitation" wounds in a suicide victim. Some suggested motives for suicide were that Luna was to take a polygraph test concerning $36,000 which disappeared from a bank robbery case that he had prosecuted. Luna had a charge card which his wife, Angela, did not know about.  His name was on an Internet dating site and he had a $25,000 credit card debt. There is also an accidental suicide theory that Luna was fabricating a kidnapping and attack and that he went too far.

Homicide 
The Lancaster County coroner who performed the autopsy ruled Luna's death a homicide by drowning. Luna left his glasses, which he needed to drive, and his cell phone on his desk. He had called defense attorneys earlier in the night saying he would fax over documents that night but they never arrived. The pool of blood in the back seat would suggest Luna was in back and someone else was driving.

Subsequent events 
In early February 2007, a private investigator and an attorney, both hired by Luna's family, filed a petition for a writ of mandamus in order to force the Lancaster County coroner to conduct an inquest into Luna's death, after an earlier request was declined.

In February 2020, the LNP newspaper in Lancaster County requested that a judge unseal coroner's records pertaining to Luna's death that were found to be in possession of the county, instead of federal prosecutors, as had been previously thought. On January 13, 2021, Judge David Ashworth ruled that the documents would remain sealed, writing that releasing the records would pose "a threat of substantially hindering or jeopardizing the open, active and ongoing criminal investigation into the death of Jonathan Luna."

See also 
 Casefile True Crime Podcast - Case 9
 List of unsolved deaths
 Thomas C. Wales

References

External links 
Casefile True Crime Podcast - Case 09: Jonathan Luna – March 5, 2016

1965 births
2003 deaths
20th-century American lawyers
20th-century African-American people
21st-century African-American people
21st-century American lawyers
African-American lawyers
American jurists of Filipino descent
Arnold & Porter people
Assistant United States Attorneys
Deaths by drowning in the United States
Deaths by stabbing in Pennsylvania
Federal Trade Commission personnel
Fordham University alumni
Lawyers from New York City
Maryland lawyers
People from the Bronx
University of North Carolina School of Law alumni
Unsolved deaths in the United States